Leopold Hager (born 6 October 1935, Salzburg) is an Austrian conductor known for his interpretations of works by the Viennese Classics (Haydn, Mozart, Beethoven and Schubert).

Hager studied piano, organ, harpsichord, conducting, and composition at the Salzburg Mozarteum (1949–1957). He was appointed assistant conductor at the Stadttheater Mainz (1957–1962) and, after conducting the Linz Landestheater (1962–1964), he was appointed first conductor of the Cologne Opera (1964–1965). He then served as Generalmusikdirektor in Freiburg im Breisgau (1965–1969), chief conductor of the Mozarteum Orchestra and of the Landestheater in Salzburg (1969–1981). In October 1976 he debuted at the Metropolitan Opera in New York, conducting Le nozze di Figaro. He also appeared as a guest conductor with other opera houses as well as orchestras in Europe (Berlin Philharmonic, Vienna Philharmonic) and the United States. In 1981, he became music director of the Orchestre Symphonique de Radio-Télé-Luxembourg (now the Luxembourg Philharmonic Orchestra), and concluded his tenure there in 1996.

Until 2004, Hager taught Orchestral Conducting at University of Music and Performing Arts, Vienna, continuing a direct line of renowned teachers including Clemens Krauss, Hans Swarowsky, and succeeding Österreicher.

From 2005 to 2008, Leopold Hager served as Chief Conductor at the Vienna Volksoper, conducting their new productions of The Magic Flute, La Traviata, Die Meistersinger von Nürnberg, Les Contes d'Hoffman and Turandot.

References 

1935 births
Living people
Musicians from Salzburg
Male conductors (music)
Mozarteum University Salzburg alumni
21st-century Austrian conductors (music)
Academic staff of the University of Music and Performing Arts Vienna
21st-century male musicians